Ishani Shrestha (born 5 May 1991) is a Nepalese beauty pageant titleholder who was crowned Miss Nepal World  2013. She represented Nepal in Miss World 2013 in Bali, Indonesia where she made history by securing a place in top 10 and winning the Beauty with a Purpose title.

Early life
Ishani Shrestha was born and raised in the capital city of Kathmandu, Nepal to parents from Kathmandu. She has three younger siblings and attended the Triyog High School, in Kathmandu. She then emigrated to Boulder, Colorado and graduated from Fairview High School in 2009.  She then attended the Business School at the University of Colorado.

Education
Shrestha completed her primary education from Triyog High School, Kathmandu Nepal. She completed and graduated from Fairview High School in Boulder, Colorado. She then attended The University of Colorado for Business. Shrestha tried studying Dentistry in People's Dental College, Kathmandu Nepal but dropped out in her second year.

Career
Shrestha is now a well established media personality, model, and an entrepreneur. She also worked as Young Conservation Ambassador for World Wildlife Fund in Nepal.

Miss Nepal 2013
Ishani came from Colorado, United States to compete Miss Nepal 2013 where she won Miss Nepal World 2013 as well as the sub title of Miss Catwalk.

Miss World 2013
Ishani Shrestha was awarded the title of "Beauty with Purpose 2013". She was presented this award for her outstanding video presentation and social work in which she traveled to the rural places of Nepal to promote and raise awareness to people on Oral Hygiene. Ishani was one of the eleven contestants who received the opportunity to showcase their country's culture dance in Miss World 2013. She danced her heart out on the song, "Maiti Ghar" for the Dances of The World. In the contest, she was the second runner up for Multi Media in Miss World 2013 and also was finalists in several different competitions.

She also placed 2nd runner-up for the title, The Peoples' Champion (Multimedia) at Miss World 2013.
Ishani Shrestha was a top 10 finalists of Miss World 2013; the furthest a Nepalese contestant had ever reached before.

References

External links

 Ishani Shrestha Official Website
 Miss Nepal 2013 Profile

1991 births
Living people
People from Chitwan District
People from Kathmandu
Miss World 2013 delegates
Miss Nepal winners
Nepalese female models
Nepalese beauty pageant winners